Zostera nigricaulis is a species of eelgrass native to the seacoasts of New South Wales, Victoria, South Australia, Western Australia and Tasmania, and across the Pacific in Chile. It was first discovered on Kangaroo Island in South Australia in 1988.

References

nigricaulis
Angiosperms of Western Australia
Flora of South Australia
Flora of Tasmania
Biota of the Pacific Ocean
Biota of the Indian Ocean
Flora of New South Wales
Flora of Victoria (Australia)
Plants described in 2005
Salt marsh plants